Events in the year 1918 in India.

Incumbents
 Emperor of India – George V
 Viceroy of India – Frederic Thesiger, 1st Viscount Chelmsford

Events
 National income - 26,105 million
 Oct 15 - Shirdi Sai Baba's death
 1918 flu pandemic in India
 Kheda Satyagraha

Law
Usurious Loans Act

Births
19 August – Shankar Dayal Sharma, 9th president of India (died 1999)

Deaths
22 July – Indra Lal Roy, World War I flying ace, killed in action (born 1898).
15 October – Sai Baba of Shirdi, guru, yogi and fakir (born 1835).

References

 
India
Years of the 20th century in India